Tuja-Stadion (formally known as ESV-Stadion) is an 11,418 capacity stadium in Ingolstadt, Germany. It is primarily used for football and was the home of ESV Ingolstadt until they merged with MTV Ingolstadt to become FC Ingolstadt 04. It also hosted four football matches during the 1972 Summer Olympics. The stadium was modified in 2008 to suit 2nd division criteria. A new stadium was built and completed before the 2010/11 season.

References
1972 Summer Olympics official report. Volume 1. Part 1. p. 121.
1972 Summer Olympics official report. Volume 3. p. 359.
Weltfootball.de profile 
World Stadiums.com profile.

Football venues in Germany
Venues of the 1972 Summer Olympics
Olympic football venues
FC Ingolstadt 04
Sports venues in Bavaria
American football venues in Germany
1932 establishments in Germany
Sports venues completed in 1932